SS Afrique was a passenger ship of the French shipping company Compagnie des Chargeurs Réunis, which entered service in 1907 and sank on 12 January 1920. Only 34 people survived out of the 609 on board.

The final voyage
In the early morning of 10 January 1920 Afrique sailed from the Gironde estuary with 609 passengers and crew, on her usual route bound for Dakar via other ports of the French West Coast. This was her 58th voyage.

Passengers
The exact number of passengers on board, remained uncertain for a long time due to the presence of African soldiers and workers in third class. It has subsequently been established that, in all classes there were 602 passengers, including 28 non-African soldiers, 192 Senegalese troops, ten civilian natives called laptots, 106 people in first class (including 19 children), 67 in second class and 81 in third class, some of whom were in steerage with the "laptots".

Sinking
The weather made it hard to repair the engines and Afrique drifted onto a reef and went aground. The hull started to break up. The severe weather hampered rescue ships responding to her distress calls, and on 13 January 1920 at 3 o'clock, Afrique lost all contact with the other ships and sank soon after.

There were only 34 survivors from her 135 crew and 602 passengers. Only one of the passengers was amongst the survivors.

References

Sources
http://www.wrecksite.eu/wreck.aspx?132499
http://www.maritimequest.com/daily_event_archive/2006/jan/12_ss_afrique.htm

1907 ships
Passenger ships of France
Shipwrecks of France
Maritime incidents in 1920
Ships built on the River Tyne